Legislative elections were held in Adjara, an autonomous republic within Georgia, on October 1, 2012. Adjara elected its 18-member parliament, Supreme Council, in the region's 6th local legislative election since Georgia declared independence from the Soviet Union in 1991.

Background
The 18-member Supreme Council of Adjara is elected for a 4-year term. Six of its members are elected through the majoritarian contest in single-mandate constituencies and the remaining 12 seats are filled through the proportional contest from those parties or blocs which clear 5% threshold. 

The last election, held in November 2008, was won by Georgia's ruling United National Movement, which had 15 seats in the Council. The remaining 3 seats were won by the opposition Christian-Democratic Movement.

Results
The election was held simultaneously with the nationwide parliamentary election on October 1, 2012. The opposition Georgian Dream coalition, spearheaded by Bidzina Ivanishvili, received 57.55% of votes in the proportional, party-list contest; the incumbent United National Movement party, led by President of Georgia Mikheil Saakashvili, garnered 36.94%. Other five parties, which were running in the Adjara election, failed to clear 5% threshold. The Christian-Democratic Movement received 2.82%, the Georgian Labour Party 1.28%, and the New Rights 0.55%. The Georgian Dream candidates won in 3 out of Adjara's 6 single-mandate constituencies (Batumi, Kobuleti, and Khelvachauri); other 3 constituencies (Keda, Khulo, and Shuakhevi) were won by the United National Movement. 

As a result, the Georgian Dream secured 13 seats and the remaining 8 seats were taken by the United National Movement.

References

Adjara
Elections in Adjara
Adjara
History of Adjara